The 1924 Illinois gubernatorial election was held on November 2, 1924. Incumbent first-term Republican Governor Len Small defeated Democratic nominee Norman L. Jones with 56.72% of the vote.

Primary elections
Primary elections were held on April 8, 1924.

Democratic primary

Candidates
Charles M. Borchers, former United States House of Representatives and former Mayor of Decatur, Illinois
Lee O'Neil Browne, State Representative
Norman L. Jones, former State Representative and incumbent circuit judge
Kent E. Keller, former State Senator
Charles B. Thomas, Democratic nominee for Treasurer of Illinois in 1904

Results

Republican primary

Candidates
Len Small, incumbent Governor
Thurlow Essington, State Senator

Results

Socialist primary

Candidates
Andrew Lafin, Socialist nominee for Governor in 1920

Results

General election

Candidates

Major candidates
Len Small, Republican		
Norman L. Jones, Democratic

Minor candidates
Andrew Lafin, Socialist
William F. Dunne, Workers, newspaper editor
Fred Koch, Socialist Labor
James A. Logan, Independent Republican
Morris Lynchenheim, Commonwealth Land

Results

See also
1924 Illinois lieutenant gubernatorial election

References

Bibliography
 

1924
Illinois
Gubernatorial
November 1924 events